Helen Teresa Clitheroe (née Pattinson) (born 2 January 1974 in Preston, England) is a female former British middle and long-distance runner.

Athletics career
She competed in the 1500 m at the 2000 Olympics in Sydney and in the 3000 m steeplechase at the 2008 Olympics in Beijing.

She represented England in the 1,500 metres event, at the 1998 Commonwealth Games in Kuala Lumpur, Malaysia. Four years later she was the 1500 m bronze medallist at the 2002 Commonwealth Games.

She achieved the Olympic A qualifying standard for the 3000 m steeplechase at the Meeting Iberoamericano, in Huelva on 13 June 2008, where she finished eighth in a time of 9:43.56. Her place in the British team for the Games was confirmed when she won the British trials in a new national record time of 9:36.98. At the Games she finished sixth in her heat and did not advance to the next round of competition, despite beating her own national record with a time of 9:29.14. At the 2008 IAAF World Athletics Final, in Stuttgart, Clitheroe placed 9th in the 3000 m steeplechase in a time of 9:39.72.

She completed a spell of high-altitude training in Iten, Kenya and then came close to a 3000 m lifetime best at the Aviva International Match in January 2011, finishing with a stadium record run. The May 2011 Great Manchester Run saw her produce a career best for the 10K as she completed a dominant performance to win the race in a time of 31:45 minutes. She set herself a similar target at the European Cup 10000m in June 2011, but suffered in hot conditions and finished in fourth with a time of 32:11.29 minutes.

She continued working in the Industry as a coach, and during 2022 was coaching with the New Balance team at Manchester, working as personal coach to Ciara Mageean during her very successful 2022 season.

References

External links

1974 births
Living people
Sportspeople from Preston, Lancashire
British female long-distance runners
English female long-distance runners
English female middle-distance runners
British female middle-distance runners
British female steeplechase runners
English female steeplechase runners
Olympic female middle-distance runners
Olympic female steeplechase runners
Olympic athletes of Great Britain
Athletes (track and field) at the 2000 Summer Olympics
Athletes (track and field) at the 2008 Summer Olympics
Commonwealth Games bronze medallists for England
Commonwealth Games medallists in athletics
Athletes (track and field) at the 1998 Commonwealth Games
Athletes (track and field) at the 2002 Commonwealth Games
Athletes (track and field) at the 2006 Commonwealth Games
Athletes (track and field) at the 2010 Commonwealth Games
Athletes (track and field) at the 2014 Commonwealth Games
World Athletics Championships athletes for Great Britain
European Athletics Indoor Championships winners
British Athletics Championships winners
AAA Championships winners
Medallists at the 2002 Commonwealth Games